The 2020–21 WBBL season was the 7th season of the Women's British Basketball League, the top British women's professional basketball league, since its establishment in 2014. The season featured 11 teams from across England, Scotland and Wales.

Teams

WBBL Championship
Each team played each other once home and once away for a 20-game regular season. The top 8 teams qualified for the post-season playoffs.

Standings

WBBL Playoffs

Quarter-finals

Semi-finals

Final

WBBL Cup
The 2020-21 WBBL Cup was held at the start of the season. Caledonia Pride, Durham Palatinates and Essex Rebels did not participate. The remaining clubs were split into two regional groups, playing each other once home or away. The top two teams from each group advanced to the semi-finals. Leicester Riders won their first WBBL Cup title, defeating Sevenoaks Suns in the final.

Qualification Stage
North

South

Semi-finals

Final

WBBL Trophy
The 2020-21 WBBL Trophy was a straight knockout competition featuring all eleven clubs. One match was forfeited (London vs. Sevenoaks) due to COVID-related player isolations. London Lions won their first WBBL Trophy title, defeating Nottingham Wildcats in the final.

First round

Quarter-finals

Semi-finals

Final

References

External links

Seasons in British basketball leagues
2020–21 in European women's basketball leagues
2020 in British women's sport
2021 in British women's sport